Marco Campos (24 February 1976 – 15 October 1995) was a Brazilian racing driver. He died in an accident in a Formula 3000 race at the Circuit de Nevers Magny-Cours, making him the only driver to be fatally injured in the International Formula 3000 series. His death would be the last at the top level of feeder series racing until the fatal accident of Anthoine Hubert in Formula 2 in 2019.

Career
Campos was a successful kart driver, winning the Panamerican championship in 1992 and 1993. In 1993 he also won the South American karting championship. Then in 1994 he went to drive in the European Formula Opel championship, winning the title in his first year for the Draco Junior Team.

His personal friend Mario-Alberto Bauér negotiated a deal for Marco to race for the WTS F3 Team of Michael Schumacher's personal manager Willi Weber as a team mate to Ralf Schumacher. But a Brazilian sponsor lured Marco into staying with the Draco as the team jumped a step up to the International Formula 3000 championship in 1995.

On board of the newcomer's Lola-Cosworth results were hard to come by in his rookie season and Marco's only points-finish was a fourth place in Enna.

Death
Campos was killed in an accident at the season-ending race in Magny Cours. On the last lap of the season finale, on the straight before the Adelaide hairpin, his left front tyre collided with the right rear tyre of Thomas Biagi's car,  and was launched into the air. His car flipped over, and Campos' head struck the top of the concrete retaining wall whilst flying upside-down. The accident resulted in severe skull fractures and massive head trauma, and put him into a deep coma. Campos died the following day at the Lariboisière Hospital in Paris, France.

Campos was 13th in the final Drivers' Championship standings in his only F3000 season.

Other
Campos' brother, Júlio, went through karting and formula championships, winning the Skip Barber championship in 2001 in the USA and now competes in Brazil's Stock Car Brasil Championship.

Racing record

Complete International Formula 3000 results 
(key) (Races in bold indicate pole position; races in italics indicate fastest lap.)

References

External links
 

1976 births
1995 deaths
Sportspeople from Curitiba
Brazilian racing drivers
German Formula Three Championship drivers
Filmed deaths in motorsport
Racing drivers who died while racing
Sport deaths in France
International Formula 3000 drivers
Draco Racing drivers